Ajmer Sharif Dargah (also Ajmer Dargah, Ajmer Sharif or Dargah Sharif) is a Sufi tomb (dargah) of the revered Sufi saint, Moinuddin Chishti, located at Ajmer, Rajasthan, India. The shrine has Chishti's grave (Maqbara).

Location

Background 

Moinuddin Chishti was a 13th-century Sufi saint and philosopher. Born in Sanjar (of modern-day Iran), or in Sijistan, he arrived in Delhi during the reign of the Sultan Iltutmish (d. 1236). Moinuddin moved from Delhi to Ajmer shortly thereafter, at which point he became increasingly influenced by the writings of the famous Sunni Hanbali scholar and mystic ʿAbdallāh Anṣārī (d. 1088), whose famous work on the lives of the early Islamic saints, the Ṭabāqāt al-ṣūfiyya, may have played a role in shaping Moinuddin's worldview. It was during his time in Ajmer that Moinuiddin acquired the reputation of being a charismatic and compassionate spiritual preacher and teacher; and biographical accounts of his life written after his death report that he received the gifts of many "spiritual marvels (karāmāt), such as miraculous travel, clairvoyance, and visions of angels" in these years of his life.

History

Moinuddin seems to have been unanimously regarded as a great saint after his passing. The tomb (dargāh) of Muʿīn al-Dīn became a deeply venerated site in the century following the preacher's death in March 1236. Honoured by members of all social classes, the tomb was treated with great respect by the era's most important Sunni rulers. The 13th-century Sultan of Delhi Iltutmish paid a famous visit to the tomb in 1232 to commemorate the memory of the saint. In a similar way, the later Mughal Emperor Akbar (d. 1605) visited the shrine no less than fourteen times during his reign. He also made a pilgrimage to this tomb in 1566, with his Hindu consort, Mariam-uz-Zamani barefoot in the hopes of having sons born to them. He also reconstructed the tomb's sanctum sanctorum in 1579. Jahangir, Shah Jahan, and Jahanara later renovated the structure. An elegant covering over the dargah was constructed in 1800 by the Maharaja of Baroda.

Local and national rulers came to pray here, the dargah grew in popularity and size over the years. Razia Sultana, Nasiruddin Mahmud, Muhammad bin Tughluq, Sher Shah Suri, and Akbar, Mariam-uz-Zamani and his descendants Jahangir, Shah Jahan, Aurangzeb, Dara Shikoh and Jahanara Begum were known to have visited the shrine. 

In the present day, the tomb of Moinuddin Chishti continues to be one of the most popular sites of religious visitation for Sunni Muslims in the Indian subcontinent, with over "hundreds of thousands of people from all over the Indian sub-continent assembling there on the occasion of [the saint's] ʿurs or death anniversary." Additionally, the site also attracts many Hindus, who have also venerated the Islamic saint since the medieval period.

In 2019, the Hindustan Zinc Limited decided to renovate the complex under the Swachh Bharat Abhiyan, including many plans specifically targeted at sanitation and hygiene.

Architecture
The white marble dome of Chishti's shrine, as seen today, was built in 1532. This date is inscribed in golden letters on the Northern wall of the dargah. It is an example of Indo-Islamic architecture and the dome features a lotus and a crown of gold, donated by Rampur's Nawab Haider Ali Khan. It is located in the Ihaata Noorani of the complex. Materials used to build it include marble, brick and sandstone. The dargah has a royal darbar, Mehfil Khana, that was constructed in 1888. It is a square structure and has a patterned ceiling. Jahanara Begum donated the dargah's left facet (Begumi Dalaan), the railing around the dargah and also constructed a small platform, the Begumi Chabutra. The sanctum of the dargah has two doors. The canopy made of mother-of-pearl and silver was commissioned by Jahangir and is visible from the cenotaph's four silver posts. The ceiling is etched with gold and in 1888, the walls were gilded.

The complex has multiple structures and has eight entrance gates. However, only three of these are in use. The Nizam Gate, a yellow structure with floral designs, is the main gate and was donated by the 7th Nizam of Hyderabad Mir Osman Ali Khan in 1911. An older gate, the Shahjahani Gate, was donated by the Mughal emperor Shah Jahan. It marked the expansion of the shrine complex beyond the Buland Darwaza, built by Sultan Mahmud Khalji. Other gates include the Madar Gate and the Delhi Gate. The Jannati Darwaza is a door made of silver that is used only on rare occasions. It is also referred to as the Bihisti Darwaza.

The complex has eight tombs besides that of Chishti, belonging to members of his family. Some of these include Chishti's daughter Bibi Hafiza Jamal and Nizam Sikka, who was a water-carrier who saved Humayun's life. A huge chandelier, Sahn Chirag, was commissioned by Akbar. The Ahaat-e-Noor is a large courtyard where religious functions are held and qawwalis are sung. Near the Nizam Gate is the Naqqar Khana where music was once played from to greet visitors. A large silver chandelier was donated by the Golden Temple. The Akbari Mosque is made of red sandstone and was probably commissioned by Akbar. A more elegant mosque was commissioned by Shah Jahan in 1637 and is called the Jami Masjid. It is made of white marble. The Sandali Masjid was constructed by Aurangzeb. The complex also has a Langar Khana and a Mahfil Khana (assembly hall for qawwals, opened only during the urs). The Jhalara is a natural tank of water that is used by pilgrims. Other tanks were donated by Shah Jahan and Queen Mary of Teck in 1911.

The Jami Masjid is located to the west of the dargah, while the large marble courtyard is located on its eastern side. The Arhat-i-Noor is an enclosure restricted to women that is located on the southern side and houses the tombs of Chishti's daughter and granddaughter. More than 40 graves lie behind the Jami Masjid.

In 1568, Akbar donated a deeg (cauldron) to the dargah since he made a wish to donate it after winning the battle of Chittorgarh. The deeg was made of an alloy of seven metals, one of which was brought from Colombo, Sri Lanka. The diameter of the deeg is 20 feet. The rim of the deeg was made in such a way that it never gets hot even while the bottom of the deeg is ignited and the food is being cooked. The deeg was brought on elephants as three separate parts and the three parts were reassembled there. This deeg is the biggest deeg in the world. Akbar himself prepared the first dish in this deeg, tasted it and shared it with other fakirs near the dargah. The smaller deeg was donated by Jahangir as a part of family tradition.

Culture

The dargah has been a site for pilgrims venerated by followers of Hinduism and Islam since medieval. Pilgrims come here from around the world and offer chaddars (sacred sheets) to the shrine. Pilgrims also offer rose petals, which total up to seven tonnes per day. Women are allowed to enter the dargah. It has been estimated that around 20,000 pilgrims visit the site every day. After pilgrims exit the shrine, photographers from photo studios offer professional photos of the pilgrims at rates as cheap as 20. Most of these photographers are Hindus who migrated to Ajmer during the Partition of India.

For the langar of the shrine, Akbar and Jahangir donated degh in 1568 and 1614, respectively. These two degh are in use even today, as the dargah is known for its degh ka khana. This is made of rice, ghee, cashew nuts, almonds and raisins. People undergo the Islamic ritual purification of wudu, in which pilgrims wash their face, hands and feet prior to offering namaz. The street approaching the dargah is well-known for its food, craft items and gota work.

The daily rituals at the dargah are mainly the five mandatory prayers of Muslims, the namaz. At sunset, there is the ceremony of the Dua-e-Roshni, in which large yellow candles are carried to the darbar by the khadims. Following the prayers at night, qawwalis are sung, after which all visitors are asked to leave. Three khadims then clean the durbar with brooms made of peacock feathers. After the last person is out of the shrine, the qawwals recite the Karka, which is a musical verse in Sanskrit, Brij and Persian. The dargah is then locked and reopened only for the next day's pre-dawn prayer.

Some attribute the influence of Islam on Indian culture to have begun from the dargah, including in Tansen's music; the tolerance practiced by Salim Chishti, Abul Fazl and Abul Faizi; and in Indo-Saracenic architecture. It has been the tradition to source the incense, sandalwood paste and ittar used in the dargah from a Brahmin family, right from the times of Chishti. One shrine in the dargah complex is revered by Sikhs.

Urs Sharif festival

The death anniversary of Moinuddin Chishti, the urs, is not mourned and is celebrated since it is the day the disciple is reunited with his maker (Allah). The celebrations begin with the end of the Islamic month of Jumada al-Thani and conclude on the sixth day of the month of Rajab, a total of six days. Members of Bhilwara's Gori family march through the city towards the Nizam gate and hoist the flag on the Buland Darwaza, marking the beginning of the festival. Following this, the urs rituals begin with the sighting of the moon. This is followed by the Aser ki Namaz. Every night a mehfil-i-sama takes place at the Mahfil Khana of the complex, in which women are allowed to participate (which is not common in a dargah). The urs end with the Qul, the final prayer. During this period, pilgrims attempt to enter the dargah as many times as possible and make their prayers. The Bihisti Darwaza(made of silver) is washed with rose water by pilgrims in the afternoon. It is believed that touching it guarantees one a place in Heaven. It is believed that roses offered to the dargah during the festival are sourced from Pushkar.

About five lakh people, the approximate population of the city of Ajmer, come to attend the urs. About 2700 buses of pilgrims enter the city. The Indian Railways launches a special train service, the Garib Nawaz trains, to facilitate transport for pilgrims around the country. Vishram Sthali in the Kayad locality of Ajmer serves as a place for lakhs of pilgrims to stay during this time, although every kind of accommodation is occupied with the sheer number of pilgrims. In March 2020, it was announced that a large guest house, Rubath, would be constructed in Ajmer for the same.

Major events

Chadar offerings
Various Public figure sent 'chadar' during the Urs. 

A red and green ‘chadar’ offered by the United States Embassy on behalf of US President Barack Obama and the people of the country was presented at the Ajmer Sharif Dargah on the occasion of the 803rd Urs with a message of ‘deepest friendship’ and ‘peace’.

Delhi Chief Minister Arvind Kejriwal sent a 'chadar' offered at the dargah of Khwaja Moinuddin Chishti in Ajmer on the occasion of the Sufi saint's 809th Urs on Wednesday and prayed for the end of COVID-19.

Congress leader Rahul Gandhi met a delegation of the Congress Minority Department in the presence of its National Chairman Imran Pratapgarhi and others and sent a chadar for the 810th Urs of Ajmer Sharif Dargah.

Chadar by Afghan President Ashraf Ghani for Ajmer Sharif arrived from Kabul and was offered at the Dargah in 2021.

In 2015, Prime Minister Narendra Modi handed over a 'chadar' offered at the Ajmer Sharif dargah, in a meeting with Muslim clerics on 808th Urs of Moinuddin Chisty.

2007 bombing

On 11 October 2007, an explosion occurred in Dargah Khwaja Moinuddin Chishti's courtyard in Ajmer in Rajasthan. It was the holy fasting period of Ramazan and evening prayers had just ended. A crowd had gathered at the courtyard to break their fast. A bomb was placed inside a tiffin carrier went off. Reports said the blast claimed 7 lives and injured 17.

Special Judge Dinesh Gupta's nearly 500-page judgment was based on testimonies of 149 witnesses and 451 document submitted to his court.

On 22 March 2017, the National Investigation Agency (NIA) Special Court, sentenced two murderers named Bhavesh Patel and Davendra Gupta to life imprisonment, who were convicted along with Sunil Joshi, all of them ex-pracharaks of Rashtriya Swayamsevak Sangh. Those convicted were held guilty under the Unlawful Activities Prevention Act, Explosives Act and various sections of Indian Penal Code.

Call for beheading
On 5 July 2022, Salman Chishti, a cleric at the Dargah, was arrested after he allegedly called for the beheading of suspended Bharatiya Janata Party spokesperson Nupur Sharma for her remarks against Muhammad.

In popular culture 
The 1973 Indian film Mere Gharib Nawaz, directed by G. Ishwar, centres around a family who overcomes adversities through their piety at the shrine of Moinuddin Chishti in Ajmer. Other Indian films revolving around the dargah and the saint include Sultan E Hind (1973) by K. Sharif, Mere Data Garib Nawaz (1994) by M Gulzar Sultani.

Gallery

See also

 Nizamuddin Dargah
 Shah Jalal Dargah
 Shrine of Baba Farid
 Turabul Haq Dargah
 Ajmer rape case

Footnotes

References

Citations

Bibliography

Further reading

External links
 

 

Dargahs in India
Tourist attractions in Ajmer
Religious buildings and structures in Rajasthan
Religious tourism in India
Chishti Order
Sufi shrines in India